Ted McGinley (born May 30, 1958) is an American actor. He is known for his roles as Jefferson D'Arcy on the television sitcom Married... with Children and as Charley Shanowski on the ABC sitcom Hope & Faith. He was a late regular on Happy Days, Dynasty and The Love Boat and is known for playing the villainous role of Stan Gable in the film Revenge of the Nerds and several made-for-television sequels.

Early life
McGinley grew up in Newport Beach, California. His paternal grandfather was an Irish immigrant. At Newport Harbor High School, he focused on athletics and swimming and was a star player on the water polo team. He also worked as a lifeguard at the beach during summers. After graduation, McGinley attended USC on a water polo scholarship, majoring in urban planning and real estate.

At USC, McGinley was captain and two-time MVP of the water polo team as well as a member of the Sigma Chi fraternity. However, in his sophomore year, following recommendation from his girlfriend, McGinley began modeling as a way to break into the acting scene.  With his scholarship not renewed, he left USC and moved to New York in 1979.

Career
After a casting director spotted a picture of him in GQ, McGinley was cast on the comedy series Happy Days as Roger Phillips (nephew of the Cunninghams), a role he played from 1980 to 1984. During the run of Happy Days, he landed a role in the comedy film Young Doctors in Love (1982).

After Happy Days ended in 1984, McGinley appeared in Revenge of the Nerds where he played Stanley Gable, the head of the jock-run Alpha Beta fraternity and the primary antagonist of the Lambda Lambda Lambda nerd fraternity; he reprised the role in the third and fourth movies in the "Nerds" franchise, both produced for television. He went on to appear in regular roles on television series including The Love Boat and Dynasty. He then played the role of Al Bundy's best friend Jefferson D'Arcy on Married... with Children from 1991 to 1997, describing it as a "great, great gig." He had recurring roles on Aaron Sorkin's television series Sports Night as Dana's boyfriend Gordon, and The West Wing as a television news anchor. From 2003 to 2006, he played Charley Shanowski on Hope & Faith.

Two years later, he was selected for a role in Charlie Lawrence, a situation comedy about a freshman congressman from New Mexico, played by Nathan Lane. McGinley played Graydon Ford, the neighbor of Lane's title character, who was a member of the opposing political party. McGinley was also in the pilot for the 2002 CBS show Life of the Party, playing a senator.

His guest star roles include series such as Fantasy Island (1982), Hotel (1985–87), Perfect Strangers (1988), B.L. Stryker (1989), Evening Shade (1990), Dream On (1991), The John Larroquette Show (1995–96; 1997–1998), The Practice (2001), and Justice League (2002).

During and shortly after the run of Married … With Children, McGinley was a part of many film and television movies, playing different types of characters. In 1993, he played Mr. Scream in Wayne's World 2. That same year, McGinley affected a Southern accent in his role in the miniseries Wild Justice, which was poorly received by critics. Some of his television movie roles were very dark. In 1996, he was the star of Deadly Web, a movie that aired on NBC in 1996 and co–starred his wife, Gigi Rice. The movie was about a woman who was stalked on the Internet. McGinley played one of his darkest roles in 1998 in the television movie Every Mother's Worst Fear. He played Mitch Carson, a sexual predator who lures a teenage girl into his house, where he holds her captive and tortures her.

In 2008, McGinley became a contestant on the seventh season of Dancing with the Stars, and was paired with pro dancer Inna Brayer. He was the second contestant to be eliminated in the competition.

"Jumping the Shark"
McGinley was called "the patron saint of shark-jumping" by jumptheshark.com founder Jon Hein. This is a reference to the popular and enduring shows which have featured him in their latter years, often to replace a departing regular cast member. Hein writes that this is not a comment "on Ted's fine acting skills" and that "he has a great sense of humor about it, too." In one episode of Married... with Children, McGinley himself spoofed his reputation by asking Al Bundy, "Another picture, Captain? I mean, Fonzie? ....Al?" In 2003, McGinley told Melanie McFarland of the Seattle Post-Intelligencer, "I've had a lot of fun with it. To be honest with you, it's meant people are still talking about me. It's kind of doing me a favor. And people keep hiring me, so I know that I'm okay, jumping the shark."

In 2011, McGinley again made fun of his "shark-jumping" abilities in "Mitefall!", the final episode of Batman: The Brave and the Bold. In the episode, Bat-Mite (voiced by Paul Reubens) wants the show to be cancelled to usher in a new TV show called Beware the Batman. To that end, he starts replacing aspects of the show, including switching Aquaman's regular voice actor (John DiMaggio) with McGinley. Ambush Bug (voiced by McGinley's Happy Days co-star Henry Winkler) helps to reverse the situation, in part by getting McGinley to break character (and mention his six-year stint on Married... with Children) and leave, forcing DiMaggio's voice back into Aquaman.

Personal life
McGinley married actress Gigi Rice in 1991 and they have two sons, Beau (born 1994) and Quinn. They reside in Los Angeles.

Filmography

Film

Television

References

External links
 
 
 

1958 births
Living people
20th-century American male actors
21st-century American male actors
American male film actors
American male models
American male television actors
American male voice actors
American male water polo players
American people of Irish descent
American surfers
Male actors from Newport Beach, California
Male models from California
Newport Harbor High School alumni
Participants in American reality television series
University of Southern California alumni